The Mingachevir reservoir or The Mingachevir sea,) is a large reservoir in northwestern Azerbaijan. It is the largest reservoir in the Caucasus. The reservoir's filling began in 1953 and was completed in 1959.

Overview
The reservoir was built on a section of Kura River flowing through Mount Bozdağ in 1953. The filling capacity of the reservoir is  whereas the volume is 15.73 km³. It has been filled to its maximum levels in 1959, 1963, 1968, 1973, 1975, 1976, 1978, 1988 and 2010. The largest hydroelectric power station of Azerbaijan is located on the reservoir. Mingachevir Hydro Power Plant has an installed electric capacity of 401.6 megawatts.

The reservoir supplies water to Upper Karabakh and Upper Shirvan channels. It is also a source for fishing, water supplies and irrigation.

Orographic description 
Cliffs are particular for both banks of the river Kur and they are also observed where the river flows into Mingachevir reservoir. However, sandy-clayey sediments belonging to the Paleogene-Neogene are widespread in the area of reservoir. At the edges of the Mingachevir reservoir, landslide processes occur periodically.

As a possible military target
Within the context of the Nagorno-Karabakh conflict, scholars and politicians have speculated the possibility of the Mingachevir reservoir being used as a military target by Armenian forces. Russian ethnographer Sergey Arutyunov stated in a 2010 interview:

In the aftermath of the 2014 Armenian–Azerbaijani clashes, Armenia's Defense Minister Seyran Ohanyan stated at the government session on August 7 that the Troops of the Civil Defense of the Azerbaijani Ministry of Emergency Situations have recently been mainly protecting the Mingachevir Hydro Power Plant fearing an attack by the Armenian forces. In response, the Azerbaijani Defense Ministry issued a statement the next day which said that "the Armenian people should know that the response to any sabotage attempts against Mingachevir Hydro Power Plant from the Armenian side will be more miserable" and cautioned that Azerbaijan had the capability to raze Yerevan, Armenia's capital.

Telman Zeynalov, president of the National Center of Environmental Forecasting, said in an interview that the entire area from Arran (i.e. the great triangle of land, lowland in the east but rising to mountains in the west, formed by the junction of the rivers Kura and Aras) to Baku, the Azerbaijani capital, would be flooded if Mingachevir Dam was destroyed. In his words, it would lead to a "large-scale environmental disaster." Zeynalov added that the Armenian side should be cautious because the flooding "would affect both sides" and most of Armenian-occupied Karabakh would also be flooded. The latter claim was rejected by Armenian analyst Hrant Melik-Shahnazaryan who stated that the waters of the Mingachevir reservoir cannot possibly reach the highlands of Karabakh.

Armenia's former defense minister Vagharshak Harutiunyan mentioned attacking the reservoir dam in a July 2020 interview.

Vagif Dargahli, spokesperson of Azerbaijan's Ministry of Defense stated in July 2020 that the "land topography of the Mingachevir water reservoir, protective land works in the area and advanced air defense systems in service with the country’s missile defense troops make a strike on this strategically important facility impossible."

See also
 Rivers and lakes in Azerbaijan
 Shamkir reservoir

References

Reservoirs in Azerbaijan
Reservoirs built in the Soviet Union
Mingachevir